The organ pipe mud dauber (Trypoxylon politum) is a predatory wasp in the family Crabronidae. They are fairly large wasps, ranging from 3.9–5.1 cm, and have been recorded to fly from May to September. Female and male are similar in colour, a shiny black, with the end part of the back leg being pale yellow to white. The organ pipe mud dauber feeds mainly on three genera of spider: Neoscona, Araneus, and Eustala. Melittobia, a parasitoid wasp, is a common ectoparasite of T. politum prepupae. Other sources of parasitism include the Bombyliid fly  Anthrax, Chrysidid wasps, and various species of scavenger flies (Miltogramminae). The tufted titmouse (Parus bicolor) is a known predator of T. politum, and may feed on them more commonly than previously thought as the holes made by the titmouse are similar in shape and size to those made by T. politum leaving the nest after pupation.

Organ pipe mud daubers are also an exceedingly docile species of wasp, and generally pleasant to have around, as they serve to keep spider populations down. Stings to humans are only in self-defence, such as if a wasp is squeezed. There are a great many other species in the genus Trypoxylon (over 700 worldwide), mostly smaller in size and less abundant.

Distribution and habitat
The Organ pipe mud dauber ranges from Southeastern Canada to Eastern United States Mud daubers use tree holes or the underside of bridges to construct their nests out of mud. Nest site choice usually depends on 3 specifications: a smooth vertical surface with ample shade and rainfall protection, a source of mud nearby, as well as an adjacent forest. The females form long mud tubes consisting of multiple cells, which they will fortify with paralyzed spiders. The female then lays an egg in each cell, leaves the nest and, once hatched, the larvae feed on the spiders. The larvae then pupate until they become adults. A female can either build a new nest, use an abandoned one, challenge another female making one to claim it as her own, or (on rare occasions) enter a freshly constructed one and remove the egg to replace it with her own. The female constructs, on average, 5 to 6 pipes in a cluster. These pipes can either be built side-by-side or on top of each other. When pipes are added in layers, the survivability of the freshly hatched adults decreases as they chew their way out of a pipe to emerge. The more pipes clustered on top of one another, the less successful the new mud daubers are going to be to chew their way out alive. A newly hatched adult female will usually begin building her new nest within 48 hours of leaving her birth nest.

Life history
In the southern populations, T. politum has a partially bivoltine life history pattern: Some wasps in these populations have offspring which emerge after winter, before the end of June. Other offspring in this geographical range overwinter and reproduce after winter. North of central Virginia the wasps have a univoltine life history pattern, and only produce one generation per year

Behaviour
Mud daubers are unique, compared to many other wasps, in that males stay at the mouth of the nest to protect the offspring. The male guards the young from intruders, parasites, and other males. This energy investment, to increase the likelihood in the survivability of their offspring, is known as parental care, and is common among many other hymenopteran, such as bees and ants. The male may also help the female in nest construction. Like other wasps, T. politum is haplodiploid. The unfertilized eggs generate males and fertilized eggs become females. Adult mothers feed the fertilized (female) eggs more than the unfertilized eggs. Because of this additional food allotment, females tend to be the larger of the two sexes. This uneven division of resources is called sex allocation. Females showed a positive correlation between body size and increased fecundity, which offers an explanation as to why there is a bias for increased female food provision and body size.

Gallery

References

External links

Bugguide.net
Florida Nature, Organ Pipe Mud Dauber
Bug of the Week: Organ Pipe Mud Dauber
Pipeorgan Mud Daubers, This Week at Hilton Pond, 1–7 April 2002
 A pictorial life cycle of organ pipe wasps

Crabronidae
Insects described in 1773